Tan Chi-chung (born February 24, 1990) is a Taiwanese male weightlifter, competing in the 56 kg category and representing Chinese Taipei at international competitions. He participated in the men's 56 kg event at the 2015 World Championships, and at the 2016 Summer Olympics. He won the bronze medal at the 2011 Summer Universiade.

Major results

References

1990 births
Living people
Taiwanese male weightlifters
Sportspeople from Taipei
Weightlifters at the 2016 Summer Olympics
Olympic weightlifters of Taiwan
Universiade medalists in weightlifting
Universiade bronze medalists for Chinese Taipei
21st-century Taiwanese people